The Havanese, a bichon-type dog, is the national dog of Cuba, developed from the now extinct Blanquito de la Habana ("little white dog of Havana"). The Blanquito descended from the also now-extinct Bichón Tenerife. It is believed that the Blanquito was eventually cross-bred with other bichon types, including the poodle, to create what is now known as the Havanese. Sometimes referred to as "Havana Silk Dogs", this was originally another name for the Blanquito de la Habana.

The Havanese is small in size and sturdy in structure with a tail carried over its back and ears that drop and fold. The coat is abundant, long, and silky, and comes in all colors. The Havanese has a spirited personality and a curious disposition, and is notable for its springy gait, a characteristic that distinguishes the breed from all others. The Havanese is considered an ideal family pet and a true companion dog. They are highly adaptable to almost any environment. Because of their strong social needs, Havanese will not thrive in an environment where they are isolated for several hours each day.

Characteristics

Appearance
Though it is a toy dog, Havanese are sturdy and not overly delicate. The body, measured from point of shoulder to point of buttocks, is slightly longer than the height at the withers, giving the dog the appearance of being slightly longer than tall. The length of the body results from the long ribcage, not the loins.

A unique aspect of the breed is the topline, which rises just slightly from withers to croup, creating a topline that is straight but not level. Renowned for their flashy, lively gait, their strong rear drive and slightly shorter upper arm produce a springy motion rather than a far-reaching one. The angle of the topline does not change while moving at a natural gait.

The muzzle is full and tapers slightly at the nose. It does not have the appearance of being short or snipy. Length of skull measured from stop to point of occiput is equal to the length of muzzle. The top of the skull is rather flat and the back skull is rounded.

The length from foot to elbow is equal to the length from elbow to withers. The fore chest is pronounced. When in a standing position, the sternum lines up with the elbows, creating a deep chest. Ribs are well-sprung and the abdomen is moderately tucked up.

The Havanese has dark brown eyes and almond-shaped lids surrounded by black pigment. The ears, when extended, reach half way to the nose. They arc slightly upward at the base and hang down on the sides of the head without touching the face. The tail is carried arched forward up over the back. While the tail's long plume of hair falls on the body, the tail itself never touches the back. The rarest color of a Havanese is chocolate.

Coat and color

The coat is long, soft, lightweight, and silky. The Havanese coat is slightly wavy, profuse, and undulating. Unlike other double-coated breeds, the Havanese outer coat is neither coarse nor overly dense, but rather soft and light. The undercoat is sometimes completely absent. The Havanese coat should be very soft, almost cool to the touch, like unrefined silk (compared to the Maltese coat, which feels like refined silk). However, in some dogs the coat can become too silky, looking oily. On the other end of the spectrum, Havanese coats can be too harsh or cottony, giving a frizzy appearance.

Because the Havanese is a tropical animal, the coat is fine and lightweight, designed to act as a sunshade and cooling agent on hot days. This means that, though the coat is abundant and may appear warm, the Havanese must be protected from the cold. These dogs chill easily so keeping their coats longer in winter is essential.

The coat is shown naturally brushed out, or in some countries it may be corded, a technique which turns the long coat into cords of hair, similar to dreadlocks in humans. This corded look may be difficult to achieve for the first timer, so it is always recommended that someone interested in cording their Havanese consults someone who has done it before. Brushing out their fur is essential. This breed's fur grows very fast and without brushing it, the fur can become tangled easily. Also, even though this breed is hypoallergenic, Havanese have hair that doesn't fall off (shed) but it still needs to be groomed.

Although there are a few arguments on whether the original Havanese were all white or of different colors, modern Havanese are acceptable in all coat colors and patterns. All colored dogs should have a black nose and black pigment around the eyes, with the exception of chocolate (brown) dogs, which may have dark brown pigment on their nose instead. Examples of coat colors are white, cream, fawn, red, chocolate brown, beige, gold, silver, blue, and black. The coat may be one solid color or have markings in one or more other colors. For example, sable, brindle, black & tan, tri-color, Irish pied, parti colored, belton, or piebald, black and white, beige black, and white.

Temperament

The Havanese becomes very attached and are very loyal to their owners, often attaching to one person especially whom they will closely follow. The Havanese is not suited to be alone all day. Although the Havanese is an active and lively dog, it is small enough that much of its exercise needs can be met in a house or yard, and it therefore does not require as much vigorous exercise as other breeds. However, exercise is still necessary for this breed to be happy and healthy.

The Havanese is satisfied when their owner is satisfied. They are very friendly dogs and do not typically bark at strangers, but some individuals are more shy than others. The Havanese is not a yappy dog, but it will alert its owners to approaching people. Usually acknowledging that you have heard their alert is enough to make them cease. Some have strong attachment issues, known by their owners as velcro dogs, following household members everywhere. The Havanese is known for its lively personality and temperament, and it loves to play, but it should not live outside exclusively. Though it enjoys outdoor activity, it prefers being inside with its owner. They are good with children. They love to perform in front of others and have a great need for affection. This breed is not afraid to show affection and loves getting attention. They manage well with people of all ages and can thrive in any size home.

Health

Havanese are generally healthy and sturdy with relatively few serious health issues. They typically live 14 to 16 years. Havanese organizations, such as the Havanese Club of America, monitor genetic issues to prevent propagation within the breed.

Havanese suffer primarily from luxating patella, liver disease, heart disease, cataracts and retinal dysplasia. Havanese sometimes tear and may develop brown tear stains which is especially noticeable on white or light coats.

The Havanese Club of America developed a system to encourage widespread participation of seven recommended tests for eye disease (CERF), congenital deafness (BAER), patellar luxation, cardiac diseases, hip dysplasia, hip joint disorder (Legg-Calve-Perthes), and elbow dysplasia. The Canine Health Information Center (CHIC) program promotes testing and reporting of health test results for the Havanese breed. CHIC is a centralized canine health database jointly sponsored by the AKC Canine Health Foundation (CHF) and the Orthopedic Foundation for Animals (OFA). Testing required for a Havanese to receive a CHIC certificate includes OFA BAER, OFA Hips, OFA Patellas, and annual CERF exams. This provides an outstanding research tool for performing searches on individual dogs and also links health testing results of the dog's related pedigree information (parent, offspring, and sibling), when those related dogs have been health tested.

History
The Havanese is a member of the bichon family of dogs. The progenitors of the breed are believed to have come from Tenerife. Ship manifests from Tenerife bound for Cuba list dogs as passengers brought aboard, and these dogs were most probably the dog of Tenerife. Some believe the entire bichon family of dogs can be traced back to the Tenerife dog, while others theorize that the origins are in Malta, citing the writings of Aristotle, and other historical evidence of the early presence of such dogs in Malta. Whatever the actual origins of bichon dogs, these little dogs soon became devoted companions to the Spanish colonists in Cuba and were highly admired by the nobility.

As part of the Cuban Revolution, upper-class Cubans fled to the United States, but few were able to bring their dogs. When American breeders became interested in this rare and charming dog in the 1970s, the US gene pool was only 11 dogs. The American Kennel Club (AKC) only officially recognized the Havanese breed in 1996.

With dedicated breeding, and the acquisition of some new dogs internationally, the Havanese has made a huge comeback and is one of the fastest growing breeds of dogs in the AKC. The 2013 AKC statistics rank the Havanese as the 25th most popular pure-breed in the United States, a rise in popularity from 28th place in 2012.

Activities
Because of the Havanese's friendly and readily trained nature, it is used for a variety of jobs involving the public, including therapy dogs, assistance dogs, such as signal dogs for the hearing impaired, performing dogs, mold and termite detection, and tracking.

Havanese also compete in a variety of dog sports, such as dog agility, flyball, musical canine freestyle, and obedience training.

Famous owners
Havanese dogs have been the pets of many people who were affluent enough to support a non-productive animal. They include:
 Ernest Hemingway, who owned a farm near Havana, and had a Havanese dog with him in Key West.
 Queen Victoria of England owned two.
 Charles Dickens
 Barbara Walters
 Napoleon III

As pets

Grooming

The profuse coat needs to be thoroughly combed at least twice per week. A Havanese with a dense or curly coat will be more prone to tangling and matting, thus requiring more frequent combing, than one with a silky, slightly wavy coat. If not showing the dog, it can be trimmed shorter to require less brushing. Many pet owners clip their dogs into a 1–2 inch long "puppy cut" for ease of maintenance. When owners give them a bath, they must make sure to dry them. Some in shorter clips can blot and air dry, but most will need to be blown dry. Owners can also comb their hair out after bathing so as not to dry in mats. Use high air but low heat to protect their sensitive skin.

Hair that grows on the bottom of their feet between the paw-pads needs trimming to allow traction on smooth floors. If they go out in the snow, ice clumps will stick between their paw pads, which can be rinsed off in warm water or protected against with booties.

Some develop tear staining. A veterinarian might suggest treating red yeast issues to help diminish or eliminate staining; sometimes diet allergens are to blame and switching to a food without common allergens can be helpful. Excess tearing is sometimes a result of hair getting into the eyes; it is recommended that hair below eyes be allowed to grow out instead of shaved out. Havanese can wear a topknot or small braids to keep the hair out of their eyes during everyday activities.

As with any dog with dropped ears, the ears must be kept clean to help prevent ear infections. A cotton ball can be placed just inside each ear before bathing to prevent excess water from entering in. After bathing, since it may be moist, pluck a few hairs inside the dog's ears to let air circulate through, preventing fungus from building.

Training
Since the Havanese is a toy dog, it is smart and can be easily trained. It is best to train this dog at a young age, because some habits will stick as they become older. However, training these dogs while they are older is still possible. Like many toy breeds, the Havanese can be difficult to housebreak. However, Havanese can be trained to use a litter box or puppy pads, which can greatly reduce issues with housebreaking. This breed is very smart and can be housetrained faster than most toy dogs.

As show dogs

The breed standard notes that except for slight trimming around the feet to allow for a tidy foot, they are to be shown untrimmed; any further trimming, back-combing, or other fussing is against type and will not be allowed to the point of precluding placement in dog shows. The breed standard specifies that the tail may not be docked. The American Kennel Club Standard allows head furnishings above each eye to be held in two small braids secured with plain elastic bands. However, many owners prefer to clip their pet's hair short for easy upkeep.

Havana Silk

A Havana Silk Dog is a type of dog from Cuba.  The modern Havana Silk Dog is derived  from recent Havanese dogs. Breeders have sought to re-create older depictions of the breed based on paintings, sculptures, and written descriptions.  Compared to some Havanese, breeders seek to give the Havana Silk longer, straighter forelegs, a flatter, silkier coat, a longer muzzle, and smaller ears.

After 10 years of attempting to convince Havanese breeders to breed away from osteochondrodysplasia, many of the original leadership of the Havanese Club of America decided to leave the organization in order to create a breed that they feel more accurately represents the original dogs from Cuba.
They began referring to their dogs as Havana Silk Dogs, claiming them to be a different breed from the Havanese. However, the Havana Silk Dog is not recognized by the American Kennel Club (AKC) as separate from the Havanese, and many Havana Silk Dogs are also registered under the name "Havanese" with the AKC. The Havana Silk Dog Association of America is not currently seeking to register their breed with the AKC.

In an effort to preserve type and sound health, Havana Silk Dog breeders do not "cross-breed" their dogs with a Havanese who is not registered as a Havana Silk Dog.

See also
 Dogs portal
 List of dog breeds
 Lap dog
 Rare breed (dog)
 Companion Dog Group
 Toy Group

References

External links

 

Companion dogs
Dog breeds originating in Cuba
FCI breeds
Rare dog breeds
Bichon